Sail Away is a musical with a book, music and lyrics by Noël Coward. The show was the last musical for which Coward wrote both the book and music, although he wrote the music for one last "book" musical in 1963. The story centres on brash, bold American divorcee Mimi Paragon, working as a hostess on a British cruise ship. The musical ran on Broadway (1961) and in the West End (1962) and has been revived since.

Background
Elaine Stritch started in the show in a "relatively minor role and was only promoted over the title and given virtually all the best songs when it was reckoned that the leading lady...although excellent, was rather too operatic for a musical comedy." During out-of-town tryouts in Boston, Coward was "unsure about the dramatic talents" of one of the leads, opera singer Jean Fenn.  "They were, after all, engaged for their voices and...it is madness to expect two singers to play subtle 'Noel Coward' love scenes with the right values and sing at the same time."  Joe Layton suggested "What would happen if ...we just eliminated [Fenn's] role and gave everything to Stritch? ...The show was very old-fashioned, and the thing that was working was Elaine Stritch...every time she went on stage [she] was a sensation. The reconstructed 'Sail Away'...opened in New York on 3 October."

According to Ben Brantley, "Coward wrote in his diary that Ms. Stritch sang 'so movingly that I almost cried.' He went on to say about making her the show's star: 'There is no doubt about it. I made the right decision.'"

Productions
Sail Away had out-of-town tryouts for three weeks each in Boston and Philadelphia. The show opened on Broadway 3 October 1961, at the Broadhurst Theatre and closed on 24 February 1962 after 167 performances. It was directed by Coward (the last of his works that he directed) and choreographed by Joe Layton with scenic design by Oliver Smith, costumes by Helene Pons and Oliver Smith, and lighting by Peggy Clark. The original Broadway cast starred Elaine Stritch as Mimi Paragon, James Hurst as John Van Mier, and Margalo Gillmore as Mrs. Van Mier.

The show was then staged at the Savoy Theatre in the West End in 1962, where it opened on 21 June and ran for 252 performances, until 26 Jan 1963, directed by Coward. The original London cast starred Stritch and David Holliday as John, and featured Grover Dale, Sheila Forbes, Edith Day, John Hewer, Stella Moray and Tony Adams. The musical was then produced, with Coward's personal directorial attention, in Melbourne in 1963, starring Maggie Fitzgibbon.

It was revived at the Rhoda McGaw Theatre in Woking, England in 1998.  Gerald Gutierrez directed a November 1999 staged concert version in the Weill Recital Hall of Carnegie Hall, starring Stritch. A concert version played in July 2008 at Sadler's Wells' Lilian Baylis Theatre, directed by Ian Marshall Fisher in the Lost Musicals series, starring Penny Fuller as Mimi, Vivienne Martin as Mrs. Van Mier, and Rupert Young as John.

Not only did Coward write the book, music and lyrics, and also direct the show, he even designed the show poster. Some of its songs are well known, including "Why Do the Wrong People Travel?" "Useless, Useful Phrases", "The Customer's Always Right" and the title song. The song "Sail Away" was first used by Coward in his 1950 musical Ace of Clubs.

Plot
Mimi Paragon is the American cruise director on board the British luxury cruise ship Coronia, bound for a Mediterranean cruise. Mimi is middle-aged and divorced. The younger Johnny Van Mier romances Mimi. During the course of their ship romance, they have to deal with annoying and troublesome passengers such as the Sweeneys. The Sweeneys confide that the secret to their long marriage is that they have disliked each other so intensely, over such a long period of time, that others now find them endearing. ("The Bronxville Darby and Joan").

Songs

Act I
 "Come to Me" – Mimi Paragon and Stewards
 "Sail Away" – John Van Mier
 "Where Shall I Find Him?" – Nancy Foyle
 "Beatnik Love Affair" – Barnaby Slade, Nancy and the Passengers
 "Later Than Spring" – John
 "The Passenger’s Always Right" – Joe and Stewards
 "Useless, Useful Phrases" – Mimi
 "Go Slow, Johnny" – John
 "You’re a Long, Long Way from America" – Mimi and Company

Act II
 "The Customer’s Always Right" – Ali and the Arabs
 "Something Very Strange" – Mimi
 "The Little Ones’ ABC" – Mimi, Alvin Lush and the Children
 "Don’t Turn Away from Love" – John
 "When You Want Me" – Barnaby and Nancy
 "Why Do the Wrong People Travel" – Mimi
 "When You Want Me" (Reprise) – The Company

A song titled "The Bronxville Darby and Joan" was added for the London production.

Notes

External links
 
 Interview, Theatre Arts Magazine, September 1961
 'Sail Away' at noelcowardmusic.com

1961 musicals
Broadway musicals
Musicals by Noël Coward